Alexandre Cougnaud (born 5 December 1991) is a French racing driver. who currently competes in the European Le Mans Series with Graff Racing.

Career

Early career
Cougnaud, born in Les Sables-d'Olonne, France, began karting in 2002 and raced primarily in his native France country. Having finished sixth in the Formula Kart France series in 2008, he entered the Formul'Academy Euro Series the following year, driving for Signatech; he finished 14th in the championship, with eight points. In 2010, he entered four rounds of the Formula Renault 2.0 Suisse for ARTA Engineering; he took a single podium, and finished ninth in the championship, with 57 points. In 2011, he entered a single round of the Championnat VdeV with AB Sport Auto, in addition to fourteen rounds of the Formula Renault 2.0 Alps with ARTA Engineering, and three races of the Formula Ford EuroCup with Cliff Dempsey Racing; he was classified tenth in the Championnat VdeV, and 17th in the Formula Renault Alps.

European F3 Open
In 2012, Cougnaud decided to race in "Copa/Cup Class" of the European F3 Open Championship for the Dallara F308 cars with Top F3 French team. He had a successful season, finishing 3rd in the overall classification of the Cup class with eight podiums.

In 2013, Cougnaud joined the Italian team RP Motorsport to drive a Dallara F312 car. He and Santiago Urrutia were originally the two drivers chosen to drive a F312 car for Fabio Pampado's team; and they have been joined by Alexander Toril  and Sandy Stuvik to compete in the European F3 Open with a Dallara Formula 3 F312 as well.

Cougnaud had some difficulties with the set-up of his car at the beginning of the season, especially in bad weather conditions and he also incurred several penalties, like at Silverstone, where he finished fifth in the second race but got a 30-second penalty after the race, so fifth place was for Stern.

He had a good result at Jerez where he finished fourth in the first race, and third in the second one.

At Monza, in October, he did his best performance of the season in the second race : pole position, P2 and fastest lap. He could not resist to his teammate Sandy Stuvik in the last lap.

Cougnaud had a great finish of the season at Barcelona finishing in third position for the first race and winning the second one (his first victory in Formula 3).

Porsche Carrera Cup France
In both 2014 and 2015 Alexandre Cougnaud raced in the Porsche Carrera Cup France championship. He finished in 10th position the first year and in 12th position the second year.

European Le Mans Series
In 2016, Alexandre joined the famous European Le Mans Series (ELMS), a European sports car racing endurance series inspired by the 24 Hours of Le Mans race and run by the Automobile Club de l'Ouest (ACO).
For his first year in ELMS, Alexandre won two races for the Yvan Muller Racing team. The first one being the prestigious Road To Le Mans race and the second one, the last leg of the 2016 championship in Estoril.

In 2017, Alexandre extended his contract with the Yvan Muller racing team for one year. After two legs he is in second position of the LMP3 classification with one podium (2nd position) in Monza.

Racing record

Career summary

Complete FIA World Endurance Championship results
(key) (Races in bold indicate pole position; races in italics indicate fastest lap)

Complete 24 Hours of Le Mans results

References

External links 

 

1991 births
Living people
French racing drivers
Formula Renault 2.0 Alps drivers
Euroformula Open Championship drivers
24 Hours of Le Mans drivers
European Le Mans Series drivers
Auto Sport Academy drivers
RP Motorsport drivers
Graff Racing drivers
Saintéloc Racing drivers
24H Series drivers
Le Mans Cup drivers